James Vo Parque (born February 8, 1975) is an American former professional baseball pitcher.

Career

Amateur career

High school
Jim Parque grew up poor in Southern California. His father made less than US$20,000 per year and his mother, a Vietnamese immigrant, worked at a textiles factory in Chinatown, Los Angeles. On this income, Parque's parents struggled to provide for Parque and his brother. Parque himself had to work in a sweatshop in Los Angeles as a young boy.

Parque attended Crescenta Valley High School where he was mentored by former All-Star pitcher Jerry Reuss. As a senior, Parque compiled a 12–3 record and was voted the Pacific League Player of the Year and MVP. He also broke the school's strikeout record. Parque began his high school baseball career at 5'1" tall and roughly 110 pounds; the school was unable to find a jersey small enough to fit him. By the time he graduated high school, he still stood at only 5'5" and weighed 132 pounds. Although he was recruited by such college baseball teams as the USC Trojans, UCLA Bruins and Miami Hurricanes, professional scouts showed little interest in him because of his size. Parque was not selected until the 50th round of the 1994 Major League Baseball draft by the Los Angeles Dodgers.

College
From 1994 to 1997, Parque attended UCLA and led the Bruins to the College World Series in 1997. Parque earned second-team Smith Super Team honors in his sophomore season in 1996. In his junior year, Parque was voted first-team All-American by Baseball America, first-team All-Pac-10 Conference, second-team by the Sporting News, second-team by the American Baseball Coaches Association, and third-team by Collegiate Baseball. Parque is one of the most decorated pitchers in UCLA Baseball history. He currently ranks second in career games started with 50, second in career total innings pitched with 334 innings, second in career strikeouts with 319, third in career pitching wins with 25, and seventh in career complete games with 10. In terms of single season pitching records for the Bruins, Parque ranks third in wins with 13 in 1997, ninth for games started with 19 in 1997, ninth for innings pitched with 125 in 1996, fourth in strikeouts with 119 in 1997, and fifth in strikeouts with 116 in 1996.

Professional career

Chicago White Sox
In the  supplemental draft, he was drafted by the Chicago White Sox in the 1st round. Parque made his major league debut the following year, pitching in 21 starts for the White Sox. He had an ERA of 5.10 with a 7-5 record in 113 innings.

In 1999, Parque finished the season with a 9-15 record in 30 starts. 

Parque made his only postseason appearance starting game one against the Seattle Mariners in the ALDS. Parque outdueled Freddy Garcia in the performance, allowing 3 runs on 6 hits in 6 innings, but the bullpen blew the lead and the game in ten innings.

The 2001 season saw Parque pitch in 5 starts only after suffering a shoulder injury, which sidelined him for the rest of the season. The injury limited Parque to just 53.1 innings between 2001 and 2002 for the Chicago White Sox and spent most of those years in the minor leagues or rehabilitating his injured shoulder. Parque was released by the Chicago White Sox after the 2002 season.

Tampa Bay Devil Rays
Parque signed a minor league with the Tampa Bay Devil Rays in 2003. He was released after posting a whopping 11.94 ERA in 5 starts. Parque failed to pitch out of the third inning in three of those five starts, but did spin a quality start against the Detroit Tigers on May 9, allowing just one hit (and four walks) through six innings for what would be his last Major League win.

Arizona Diamondbacks
In January, 2004, Parque signed a minor league deal with the Arizona Diamondbacks; however, he never appeared with the Major League team.

Return to baseball
After being out of baseball for three years, Parque announced his willingness to return to the game of baseball. He started his return by instructing lessons for the Cook County Cheetas in Oak Lawn. The Chicago Tribune reported that he threw his fastball in the range of 90 mph. On February 2, he signed a minor league contract with the Seattle Mariners. He was released by Seattle after 45 uninspiring innings on May 31, 2007. He has since been linked to steroids in December 2007, though he denied the account in the Seattle Times. In a July 23, 2009 article in the Chicago Sun-Times, Parque admitted using human growth hormone while rehabbing from a shoulder injury in 2003. At the time, HGH had not yet been banned by MLB.

See also
 List of Major League Baseball players named in the Mitchell Report

References

External links

ESPN profile and stats

1976 births
Living people
American expatriate baseball players in Canada
American sportspeople of Vietnamese descent
Baseball players at the 1996 Summer Olympics
Baseball players from California
Calgary Cannons players
Charlotte Knights players
Chicago White Sox players
Durham Bulls players
Major League Baseball pitchers
Medalists at the 1996 Summer Olympics
Nashville Sounds players
Olympic bronze medalists for the United States in baseball
People from Norwalk, California
Tacoma Rainiers players
Tampa Bay Devil Rays players
Tucson Sidewinders players
UCLA Bruins baseball players
Winston-Salem Warthogs players